This is a list of museums in New Caledonia.

 Jean-Marie Tjibaou Cultural Centre
 Memorial Convict Museum
 Museum of New Caledonia
 Noumea City Museum
 Museum of the town of Païta
 New Caledonia Maritime History Museum

See also 
 List of museums

External links 
 Institutions in New Caledonia

 
New Caledonia
Museums
New Caledonia

Museums